Grevillea coccinea is a species of flowering plant in the family Proteaceae and is endemic to the south of Western Australia. It is a low-lying or sprawling shrub with narrowly wedge-shaped to linear leaves and white, cream-coloured, and red or yellow flowers.

Description
The edges of the leaves are rolled under, obscuring all but the lower mid-vein, and the tips are usually sharply-pointed.

Taxonomy
Grevillea coccinea was first formally described in 1855 by Carl Meissner in Hooker's Journal of Botany and Kew Garden Miscellany. The specific epithet (coccinea) means "scarlet".

In 1993, Peter M. Olde and Neil R. Marriott described two subspecies in the journal Nuytsia and the names are accepted by the Australian Plant Census:

Distribution and habitat
This grevillea grows in shrub or heath and is found in southern Western Australia from Mount Manypeaks to near Hopetoun in the Esperance Plains and Mallee biogeographic regions of Western Australia. Subspecies lanata is confined to the Fitzgerald River National Park.

Conservation status
This grevillea is listed as "not threatened" by the Department of Biodiversity, Conservation and Attractions, but subspecies lanata is listed as "Priority Three" by the Government of Western Australia Department of Biodiversity, Conservation and Attractions, meaning that it is poorly known and known from only a few locations but is not under imminent threat.

See also
 List of Grevillea species

References

coccinea
Endemic flora of Western Australia
Eudicots of Western Australia
Proteales of Australia
Taxa named by Carl Meissner
Plants described in 1855